Solaris Urbino 12 electric – electric city bus of the MAXI class, produced by Solaris Bus & Coach in Bolechowo-Osiedle near Poznań since 2013. It is a member of the Solaris Urbino city bus family. The new generation has been in production since 2015, and, in 2016, it was awarded the title of Bus of the Year 2017.

Origins 
In 1999 Solaris unveiled its first city bus of the Urbino family – the Solaris Urbino 12. In subsequent years the city bus range was broadened, as new models were added, though initially these were conventionally fuelled vehicles. In 2002, Solaris presented a new version of the Urbino, the so-called 2nd generation. Two years later, in 2004, the third generation of the Urbino had its première. In 2006, at the IAA Nutzfahrzeuge trade fair in Hanover, Solaris Bus & Coach displayed a third generation bus which was also the first of its hybrid models, the Solaris Urbino 18 Hybrid made in collaboration with US firms Alisson Transmission and Cummins. It was the first serially produced hybrid bus in Europe. As a result, Solaris joined the European leaders of eco-friendly technology in public transport. Krzysztof Olszewski, founder of Solaris Bus & Coach, said at that time that ”Diesel has died, long live electricity!”. The first fully electric bus, the Solaris Urbino 8,9 LE electric, was unveiled in 2012. Initially, the range of the vehicle was merely 100 kilometres, however, with time, thanks to technological progress, the achievable range increased. The vehicle was tested among others in Poznań, Cracow, and in Warsaw. The first buyer of that electric Solaris bus was an Austrian operator, from Klagenfurt. Vehicles of that type were also the first electric buses in Poland used by a public transport operator - in 2014, two of these buses made it to the city of Ostrołęka.

3rd generation 
The IAA 2012 in Hanover saw the première of the first 100% electric bus of the MAXI class – the Urbino 12 electric. The manufacturer used a powertrain based on an asynchronous, four-pole motor of 160 kW in the prototype vehicle. Moreover, lithium-ion batteries with a capacity of 210 kWh were used to store energy recuperated during braking. A plug-in connector installed in the vehicle enabled recharging by means of an external power source. The producer also decided to electrify all external devices usually fed from a diesel engine, including i.a. air conditioning with an in-built  heat pump, that is a device also used for heating in the bus. External and interior lighting was based on LED technology. The graphic symbol of the Urbino electric featured a green dachshund, the trademark symbol of Solaris, with a cable and plug instead of a tail.

After its première in 2012, the Solaris Urbino 12 electric was produced in many different configurations, with a wide range of suppliers of powertrains and charging systems, so as to offer solutions fitted best to the individual needs of its clients.

The first five 12-metre electric buses made it to the public transport operator in Braunschweig, Germany, in 2014, as part of the EMIL programme. They were equipped with the inductive charging system PRIMOVE by Bombardier. In May 2015, public transport operator PKM Jaworzno was the first in Poland to receive an Urbino 12 electric. The same month operator MPK Kraków started test runs for two prototype vehicles. Once the tests were completed, one of the buses was bought by MPK. In May 2015, the first of a batch of 10 buses for Warsaw public transport operator MZA Warszawa was delivered. Mid-2015, Solaris also supplied four emission-free buses to Berlin municipal operator BVG. Other cities using Solaris Urbino 12 electric of the third generation include Oberhausen, Düsseldorf, Drezno and Västerås.

The electric bus model Škoda Perun was crafted based on the third generation Solaris Urbino 12 electric, and in collaboration with Czech firm Škoda Transportation. The chassis and bodywork are made by Solaris, while powertrain and electric fittings are supplied by Škoda Electric. Vehicles in this configuration are offered by Škoda Electric mostly to customers on the Czech and the Slovak market.

New (4th) generation 
In 2014, during the September IAA trade fair, Solaris displayed a diesel model of the Solaris 12 and 18 buses of the new generation (contrary to previous generations, this time instead of using the consecutive number, Solaris preferred the term ‘new generation’). A year later, at the Busworld in Kortrijk, Solaris presented the electric version of the new generation bus. Various configurations can be applied in the new generation vehicles, depending on customer needs, including a wheel hub engine of  ZF AVE 130 with a maximum power of  2 × 125 kW or, optionally, a central engine. The producer enables also the installation of different battery configurations, from 120 to 240 kWh (for Solaris High Energy batteries) and from 58 to 145 kWh (for Solaris High Power batteries) with or without the option of fast charging. The vehicles use either plug-in or pantograph recharging.

The first order for new vehicles was secured even before the official unveiling; it was placed by public transport operator Üstra from Hanover, where three buses in the new design ended up in 2015. In December 2015 tests of the battery bus of Solaris were launched by French operator RATP Paris. The first Polish city to receive a new electric Urbino was Cracow. Later on, the buses made it also to Jaworzno and Ostrów Wielkopolski, as well as Warsaw and Sosnowiec.

An equivalent of the Škoda Perun for the Urbino 12 electric of the new, fourth generation was crafted on the same terms as the previous model. In 2018 on international fair InnoTrans in Berlin German company Voith presented electric bus based on Solaris Urbino 12 electric.

The Solaris Urbino 12 electric was on display at the Hannover Messe, a public transport fair, from 23 until 28 April 2017, on the stand representing Poland's innovation power. During the trade fair, this stand was visited among others by then Polish Prime Minister Beata Szydło and Germany's Chancellor Angela Merkel.

Prizes and distinctions

Bus of the Year 
In May 2016, Solaris Bus & Coach announced that the Solaris Urbino 12 electric would take part in the Bus Euro Test 2016, an event during which the winner of the title “Bus of the Year 2017” was to be chosen. The vehicle test was held from 30 May until 3 June, on the streets of Brussels. Three other electric vehicles competed against Solaris: Irizar i2e, EbusCo 2.1, VanHool Exqui.City and the CNG fuelled Mercedes-Benz Citaro NGT. According to jurors from 20 European states, the vehicle of the Polish manufacturer scored best. The award was handed out during the IAA Nutzfahrzeuge trade fair in Hanover, in September 2016.

Other awards 

 2012: The Solaris Urbino 12 electric was named best in the bus category by the jury of the International Fair of Public Transport Transexpo 2012 in Kielce
 2013: Solaris Urbino 12 electric gets awarded the “Sustainability Prize” by German bus industry magazine “Busplaner”
 2013: The Solaris Urbino 12 electric, with an automatic system for roof-mounted fast charging, is awarded the Gold Medal of trade fair TRANSEXPO in Kielce in the “Bus” category
 2017: EBUS Award 2017 for Solaris Urbino 12 electric

Operators

References

External links 

Electric buses
Solaris Bus & Coach
Single-deck buses
Low-floor buses
Buses of Poland